Troup may refer to:

Places 
 Troup County, Georgia, United States
 Troup, Texas, United States

People 
 Alec Troup (born 1909), Scottish rugby player
 Alex Troup (1895–1951), Scottish footballer
 Anna Troup (born 1970), British ultrarunner
 Anthony Troup (1921–2008), Royal Navy officer
 Bill Troup (1951–2013), American football player
 Bobby Troup (1918–1999), American actor and musician
 Edward Troup, British tax lawyer and civil servant
 Frank Troup (1896–1924), English cricketer
 Gary Troup (born 1952), New Zealand cricketer and politician 
 George Troup (1780–1856), American politician
 George Troup (architect) (1863–1941), New Zealand architect
 Guppy Troup (born 1950), American ten-pin bowler, father of Kyle 
 James William Troup (1855–1931), American steamship captain and shipping pioneer
 Josephine Troup (died 1912), English composer
 Kyle Troup (born 1991), American ten-pin bowler, son of Guppy 
 Malcolm Troup (1930–2021), Canadian pianist
 Rasa Troup (born 1977), Lithuanian steeplechase runner
 Robert Troup (1756–1832), American soldier and jurist
 Robert Scott Troup (1874–1939), British forestry expert
 Robyn Troup (born 1988), American singer
 Ronne Troup (born 1955), American actress
 Torell Troup (born 1988), American football player
 Walter Troup (1869–1940), English cricketer

Other uses 
 USS Troup

See also 
 Troop (disambiguation)
 Troupe (disambiguation)